A silazane is any hydride of silicon and nitrogen having a straight or branched chain of silicon and nitrogen atoms joined by covalent bonds.  By extension, the word is also used for any organic derivative of such compounds. They are analogous to siloxanes, with -NH- replacing -O-. Their individual name is dependent on the number of silicon atoms in the chemical structure.  Hexamethyldisilazane contains two silicon atoms bonded to the nitrogen atom.
The majority of silazanes are moisture sensitive.

See also
 Phosphazene
 Paraformaldehyde

References

Nitrogen(−III) compounds
Silicon compounds